Avon is a town in Houston County, Alabama, United States. It incorporated in January 1957. It is part of the Dothan, Alabama Metropolitan Statistical Area. As of the 2010 census, the population of the town was 543, its highest to date, up from 466 in 2000.

Geography
Avon is located near the geographic center of Houston County at  (31.189409, -85.279156). U.S. Route 84 passes through Avon, leading west  to the center of Dothan and southeast  to the Georgia state line at the Chattahoochee River.

Demographics

2000 Census data
As of the census of 2000, there were 466 people, 185 households, and 138 families residing in the town. The racial makeup of the town was 94.42% White, 4.29% Black or African American, 0.21% Native American, and 1.07% from two or more races.  0.43% of the population were Hispanic or Latino of any race.

There were 185 households, out of which 36.8% had children under the age of 18 living with them, 61.1% were married couples living together, 9.2% had a female householder with no husband present, and 24.9% were non-families. 21.1% of all households were made up of individuals, and 8.6% had someone living alone who was 65 years of age or older.  The average household size was 2.52 and the average family size was 2.88.

In the town, the population was spread out, with 23.4% under the age of 18, 10.1% from 18 to 24, 32.2% from 25 to 44, 21.7% from 45 to 64, and 12.7% who were 65 years of age or older.  The median age was 38 years. For every 100 females, there were 98.3 males.  For every 100 females age 18 and over, there were 96.2 males.

The median income for a household in the town was $37,679, and the median income for a family was $42,273. Males had a median income of $28,438 versus $18,068 for females. The per capita income for the town was $18,152.  About 9.2% of families and 12.4% of the population were below the poverty line, including 18.9% of those under age 18 and 4.3% of those age 65 or over.

2020 Census data

As of the 2020 United States census, there were 465 people, 200 households, and 161 families residing in the town.

References

Notes

References

Towns in Houston County, Alabama
Towns in Alabama
Dothan metropolitan area, Alabama